National Highway 5 (NR5) is a  highway of southern-central Burma. It connects Taungoo to Hopong, east of Taunggyi.

Roads in Myanmar